The grey-crowned babbler (Pomatostomus temporalis) is a species of bird in the family Pomatostomidae.
It is found in Australia, Indonesia, and Papua New Guinea.
Its natural habitats are temperate forests and subtropical or tropical moist lowland forests.

Taxonomy
Two subspecies are recognised within Australia and New Guinea.

Pomatostomus temporalis temporalis – This subspecies occurs within Australia in the states of Victoria, eastern Queensland (including Cape York), New South Wales and south-eastern South Australia. It is a vagrant or accidental visitor to the Australian Capital Territory. It is also the subspecies believed to occur within New Guinea.

Pomoatostomus temporalis rubeculus – This subspecies occurs in Australia within the states of Western Australia, Northern Territory, western Queensland and a small area of northern South Australia.

The breast color is usually used as the distinguishing morphological character between the subspecies, with a creamy white breast grading to mid-grey in P. t. temporalis and a mid to deep rufous brown breast in P. t. rubeculus.  Other differences relate to brow coloration, facial bands through the eye, tail length and overall size.  A zone of intergradation occurs between the two subspecies in north-central Queensland.

Naming
A number of alternate names have been provided for the grey-crowned babbler.  
Yahoo – This popular alternate name is based on the distinctive call of the grey-crowned babbler.  The source of this name is unclear.
 Grey-crowned chatterer – Name given by A. J. North
 Happy-jack – Popular name, quoted by A. J. North and others, relating to the species habitat of moving about in 'talkative' family groups. Source of this name is not known.
 Dog-bird, barker, barking-bird – Popular names whose sources are not known.  Presumably named due to cackling soft tuk note.

Conservation status

Australia
There are numerous lists of threatened fauna from within Australia.  The official list of threatened species on the Australian Environment Protection and Biodiversity Conservation Act 1999 does not consider the grey-crowned babbler (either as a species or subspecies) to be threatened.

From other sources, the national status of the grey-crowned babbler varies.  The eastern subspecies is increasingly being considered threatened, although not by all:
  The Directory of Australian Birds considers both subspecies of the grey-crowned babbler to be secure.
  The Action Plan for Australian Birds 2000 considers the eastern subspecies (P. t. temporalis) to be near-threatened.  Within this document, this subspecies was considered to be near-threatened using criteria 'a' of Maxwell et al. (1996).  That is, this subspecies has disappeared from over 50% of its former area of occupancy and/or extent of occurrence and are at risk of further decline.  Although there has been little evident change at the northern edge of its range, the subspecies has been declining noticeably in the southern half of its range
  The Action Plan for Australian Birds 2000 considers the north-western subspecies (P. t. rubeculus) to be of least concern.

States of Australia
The conservation status of the grey-crowned babbler varies from state to state within Australia. For example:
 The grey-crowned babbler is listed as threatened on the Victorian Flora and Fauna Guarantee Act (1988).  Under this Act, an Action Statement for the recovery and future management of this species has been prepared.  On the 2007 advisory list of threatened vertebrate fauna in Victoria, the grey-crowned babbler is listed as endangered.
 The eastern subspecies of the grey-crowned babbler (P. t. temporalis) is listed as vulnerable on the NSW Threatened Species Conservation Act 1995.<ref>[http://www.threatenedspecies.environment.nsw.gov.au/tsprofile/profile.aspx?id=10660 Grey-crowned Babbler Species Profile, Department of Conservation and Environment, State of NSW]</ref>  This is the only subspecies occurring within NSW.
 The grey-crowned babbler is listed on schedule 9 (rare species) of the South Australian National Parks and Wildlife Act 1972.
 The grey-crowned babbler is not listed as a threatened species on the Western Australian Wildlife Conservation Act 1950.
 The grey-crowned babbler is listed as least conservation on the Queensland Nature Conservation Act 1992.

Threats
The key process that has led to the decline of the eastern subspecies of the grey-crowned babbler has been the historic loss and fragmentation of its preferred woodland habitat.  Grey-crowned babblers generally have a poor ability to immigrate across unsuitable habitats.  As a consequence of fragmentation, breeding success and groups sizes decline.  Babbler groups are more susceptible to stochastic events leading to local extinction from a fragment.  Once a fragment has lost its population of grey-crowned babblers, natural recolonisation rarely occurs because of the species' poor dispersal ability.

References

 Maxwell, S., Burbridge, A. A. and Morris, K. (eds).  1996, The 1996 Action Plan for Australian Marsupials and Monotremes.''  Environment Australia, Canberra.

grey-crowned babbler
Birds of Australia
Birds of New Guinea
Least concern biota of Oceania
grey-crowned babbler
Articles containing video clips
Taxonomy articles created by Polbot